The 4th Dallas-Fort Worth Film Critics Association Awards, given in January 1999, honored the best filmmaking of 1998. The organization, founded in 1990, includes 49 film critics for print, radio, television, and internet publications based in north Texas.

Winners
Best Picture: 
Saving Private Ryan
Best Director:
Steven Spielberg -  Saving Private Ryan

References

External links
Dallas-Fort Worth Film Critics Association official website

1998
1998 film awards